Georgian Aviation University is an independent accredited university in Tbilisi, Georgia.

The Aviation Institute of Georgia was founded in 1992, in the structure of Georgian Technical University. In 2005, the Aviation Institute got down from the Technical University and became Independent Georgian Aviation University. The university has an accreditation from the Ministry of Education and Science of Georgia. These days the Georgian Aviation University has almost 1000 students.

Georgian Aviation University has a strong material-technical base. The university has several type of aircraft for students, such as: A-22, Cessna-152, Piper Seneca and Boeing 737-200. It is very important that graduates successfully work in many companies and most of them work in leadership positions.

Pilot instructors with more than 10,000 hours of piloting experience train the future pilots.

Faculties

Georgian Aviation University has four faculties.

 Air transport flight exploitation
 Air transport business administration
 Engineering
 Air law

Professional training center

The professional training center has the following specialties:

 Private and Commercial Pilot training programmes
 Aircraft and aviation engine maintenance technician
 Aircraft avionics and electrical system maintenance technician
 Air carrier training program
 Construction-technician of aerodromes and automobile roads
 Accountant training program

Partners

 Boeing corporation (USA)
 National Aviation University of Kiev (Ukraine)
 Aviation University of Kharkov (Ukraine)
 State Flight Academy Of Ukraine (Ukraine)
 Technical University of Clausthal (Germany)
 Belgium Flight academy (Belgium)
 National Aviation academy of Baku (Azerbaijan)
 Nanchang Hong Kong University (China)
 Technical University of Hong Kong (China)
 Aviation Institute of Vilnius Technical University (Lithuania)
 Air navigation Institute of Riga (Latvia)
 Georgian Travel Service
 Royal Jordanian airline

References

External links
Official website in the Georgian language

Universities in Georgia (country)
Education in Tbilisi
Aviation schools
Buildings and structures in Tbilisi